is a Family Computer video game released in 1987 by Namco and developed by Piccari Games. Despite being based on the first Star Wars film, some levels are based on the later two Star Wars films. It is one of only two games in the Star Wars franchise that were released exclusively in Japan, the other being Star Wars: Attack on the Death Star. The game is a side-scrolling platform game where the player controls Luke Skywalker as he travels to join the Rebellion against the Empire.

Gameplay 
Star Wars is a side-scrolling platform game with two difficulty settings: novice and pro. Luke uses a lightsaber as his primary weapon and can also use the Force to execute special maneuvers like floating, speeding and stopping time. Energy to activate Force powers can be obtained through diamonds collected after killing an enemy, called "Force points". At the end of each level, the player must fight one of several apprentices of Darth Vader, who initially look the same as Vader himself, but will change into other creatures when hit for the first time. In two levels, the Death Star and Yavin IV, the player actually does fight the real Darth Vader. When the characters are rescued, they will help Luke by providing hints and other actions that are important to progress through the game. Certain actions at some levels require talking to the characters via an in-game menu.

Between planets, players control the Millennium Falcon from the cockpit as they fight TIE fighters that prevent the ship's entrance to the next planet.

The final level involves using the X-wing against the Death Star. While the film's climactic sequence occurred inside a long trench, the game's version can be roughly described as a vertically scrolling overhead maze-like stage, complete with dead ends and intersections. At the end, there is the reactor's duct where the proton torpedoes will be shot automatically to destroy the station. If the player fails to get to the end within a limited amount of time, the Death Star will destroy Yavin IV, and the game will be over.

The game is particularly difficult, as the player only has three lives and two continues (activated with enough Force points), and Luke dies upon touching an enemy. The Millennium Falcon and the X-Wing can sustain only one hit before being destroyed, which can be prevented by using one of three deflector shield bursts.

The game deviates from the source material, with the aforementioned examples of Darth Vader having identical apprentices that shape-shift, along with going to planets that never happened in the 1977 film, such as going to an ice planet after rescuing Leia from the Death Star.

Development
The game design is strongly inspired by the Master System game Alex Kidd in Miracle World, according to programmer Yoshihiro Kishimoto. The game was first announced in May 1987, and it came with a photo of George Lucas shaking hands with Namco founder Masaya Nakamura.

Notes

References

External links

1987 video games
Nintendo Entertainment System games
Nintendo Entertainment System-only games
Namco games
Japan-exclusive video games
Star Wars (film) video games
Video games developed in Japan